Nicholas Charles Pozo (born 19 January 2005) is an international Gibraltarian professional footballer who plays as a midfielder for the Juvenil team of La Liga side Cádiz CF.

Club career 

In 2015, he joined the youth academy of Cádiz.

International career 
Nicholas Pozo made his senior international debut for Gibraltar on the 5 June 2022 against North Macedonia.

References

External links

2005 births
Living people
Gibraltarian footballers
Association football midfielders
Gibraltar international footballers
Gibraltar under-21 international footballers
Gibraltar youth international footballers